Where There's Smoke There's Cheech & Chong is an anthology album by Cheech & Chong. Released in 2002, it collects the duo's most popular comedy routines and songs from their eight studio albums, and additional rare material, including tracks that are exclusive to this set, including radio commercials for the film Up in Smoke, "(How I Spent My Summer Vacation) Or A Day At The Beach With Pedro & Man" and "Santa Claus And His Old Lady", which were previously only released as singles, and a live recording of the duo performing the "Old Man In The Park" sketch.

Content 
Much of the content on Where There's Smoke There's Cheech & Chong derives from the albums Cheech and Chong, Big Bambu, Los Cochinos, Cheech & Chong's Wedding Album, Sleeping Beauty and Let's Make a New Dope Deal. The title track from the Up in Smoke soundtrack is also included, as well as "Born in East L.A.", from the album Get Out of My Room.

The anthology also includes the tracks "Santa Claus And His Old Lady" and "(How I Spent My Summer Vacation) Or A Day At The Beach With Pedro & Man-Part 1", which were previously only available as singles, and on compilations, but had not appeared on any previous Cheech & Chong release. The "How I Spent My Summer Vacation" single contained a second part which is not featured on this compilation and is otherwise unavailable.

Exclusive to the anthology were two radio commercials for the film Up in Smoke, and a live recording of the sketch "Old Man in the Park", which had not been recorded for any Cheech & Chong album. Also, at the time of the anthology's release, the albums Sleeping Beauty, Let's Make A New Dope Deal and Get Out Of My Room were out of print, although they have since been reissued.

The tracks "Santa Claus and His Old Lady", "Earache My Eye" and "Born in East L.A." were commercial hits.

Liner notes for the anthology were written by Dr. Demento.

Reception 

AllMusic reviewer Richie Unterberger described the material on Where There's Smoke There's Cheech & Chong as being "more juvenile than it is funny", appraising the duo's sound design and musical satires, singling the tracks "Blind Melon Chitlin'", "Framed", and "Earache My Eye" as highlights.

Track listing

References 

Cheech & Chong albums
2002 compilation albums
Rhino Records compilation albums
2000s comedy albums